AMCARA Broadcasting Network is a Philippine television broadcast company. The company is located in Katipunan Avenue, Loyola Heights, Quezon City. The company is majority-owned by the heirs of Arcadio M. Carandang, one of the pioneers of Philippine television who worked for ABS-CBN.

AMCARA owned and operated a number of UHF television stations in the provinces affiliated with ABS-CBN Sports and Action (S+A, formerly Studio 23). On January 5, 2022, its former UHF frequencies (channel 23 and 43) were assigned by the National Telecommunications Commission to Aliw Broadcasting Corporation (for channel 23) and Swara Sug Media Corporation (for channel 43).

History

1994–1996: Early years
AMCARA Broadcasting Network, Inc. was incorporated on April 11, 1994.

DWAC-TV was acquired from Ermita Electronics Corporation in July 1996, which initially owned the frequency of the station that began airing in May 1992 from a densely populated commercial area in Quezon City with a rebroadcast of MTV Asia, then telecasting from the STAR TV platform. It was later showing Channel [V] refeeds from 1994 onwards as MTV made the decision to split from STAR and form its own satellite TV portal in Asia.

1996–2010: Studio 23 era
Three years later in 1996, MTV Asia returned to the Philippine airwaves after establishing a new regional base in Singapore. ABS-CBN was picked as the broadcast arm of MTV Asia in the Philippines at the time, and DWAC-TV Channel 23 began test broadcast in September 1996 with rebroadcast of the new MTV Asia from Singapore. A month later, it launched its own programming under the station name Studio 23 and adopted the slogan "Premium Television". The station initially ran MTV rebroadcast in the day and its own shows at prime time. It also ran for 24 hours, but financial limitations forced it to sign off at 3AM every day. That has been the broadcast arrangement ever since.

Five years later, MTV Asia acquired a new local UHF frequency and Studio 23 formally became a full station, adopting rebroadcasts of its in-house cable channel Myx to fill in the void left by MTV Asia, and came up with intensified programming led by the popular reality TV game show Survivor, and several top rate US shows like 7th Heaven, Will and Grace and Charmed, among others.

By 2004, Studio 23 opened its doors to Taglish programs and adopted a new slogan, "Kabarkada Mo!". Previous to this, the station was already running its own English newscast, "News Central", from 1999 to 2010, effectively replacing the network's The World Tonight, previously on DWWX-TV Channel 2 which had moved to a cable-only newscast on ANC, the cable news channel of ABS-CBN. Studio 23 also geared its mostly young viewers to trends in the tech world with "Digital World". With the intensified Taglish presence, Studio 23 now had the nightly Tagalog gag newscast Wazzup Wazzup, the interactive youth talk show Y Speak, and several others. It even provided support shows to its highly successful local reality programs Pinoy Big Brother and Pinoy Dream Academy, both acquired from Endemol of the Netherlands and are big hits on Channel 2.

Expansion to sports programming
In 1998, ABS-CBN, through its sports division, ABS-CBN Sports, used mainly Studio 23 to highlight its own professional basketball league, the Metropolitan Basketball Association (MBA). The league adopted the home and away format used by the American professional league the National Basketball Association (NBA).  (It however sold the franchise of the league after incurring heavy losses.)  It marked the network's first serious foray into sports programming.

Later, that would be added by acquiring broadcast rights to the collegiate leagues UAAP and NCAA and the PBL.

Today, it carries a wide variety of local sporting competitions, many of which involved neighborhood schools and showcasing budding Filipino sports talents.

2010–2019: Part of ABS-CBN
The date was brought forward and ABS-CBN Corporation's acquisition of a 49% controlling stake in AMCARA Broadcasting Network ended on March 22, 2010. On July 12, 2010, ABS-CBN Corporation announced the formation of its broadcast television subsidiary, officially named Studio 23 Network. The AMCARA name will no longer be used as a terrestrial broadcaster as well as blocktime agreement, though existing AMCARA Broadcasting Network studios will keep the name. On October 23, 2010, ABS-CBN Corporation officially announced that the integration of their UHF TV network operations as well as AMCARA Broadcasting Network has been completed and the two entities will merge into one under the name of Studio 23 Network and will operate under the business name of Studio 23, Inc.

On January 17, 2014, Studio 23 ceased its commercial broadcast.

Studio 23 off-air, rebranding as S+A, and divestiture

On January 18, 2014, ABS-CBN Sports and Action, stylized as ABS-CBN Sports+Action or S+A, launched as a Filipino free-to-air sports and action channel. It was managed by ABS-CBN Sports, ABS-CBN Corporation's sports content division. The channel occupied the former channel space of its predecessor, Studio 23, a young adult-oriented network. On January 24, 2019, ABS-CBN divested its 49% stake in AMCARA to one of the majority shareholders Rodrigo V. Carandang (who is also the chief of TV5 Network engineering). ABS-CBN has also stopped paying blocktime fees to AMCARA, based on their 2019 third-quarter financial report. Carandang was named Chairman, while former GMA Network vice-president Jose Antonio Veloso was named as president.

2020: Franchise renewal and block-time issues

On May 5, 2020, ABS-CBN Sports and Action went off-air, together with ABS-CBN, DZMM and MOR due to a cease and desist order from the National Telecommunications Commission (NTC) after its legislative franchise expired on May 4.

On June 30, 2020, during the joint hearing made by the House Franchises and Good Government committees, ABS-CBN President and CEO, Carlo Katigbak made their speech, reiterating the block-time arrangement between ABS-CBN and AMCARA, saying that was done under the standard commercial agreement. Later on, Cavite 7th District representative and Senior Deputy Majority Leader, Jesus Crispin Remulla, called the block-time arrangement, "usufruct" and a dummy relationship.

2022–present: Former frequencies assigned to different companies
On January 5, 2022, its former UHF frequencies (channel 23 and 43) were assigned by the NTC to Aliw Broadcasting Corporation (for channel 23) and Sonshine Media Network International (for channel 43).

See also
ABS-CBN
Banahaw Broadcasting Corporation
Studio 23, ABS-CBN's former UHF TV network
ABS-CBN Sports and Action
DWAC-TV

References

1994 establishments in the Philippines
Television channels and stations established in 1996
Mass media companies of the Philippines
ABS-CBN Corporation
Privately held companies